Harry Piekema (born 23 May 1959, in The Hague) is a Dutch actor, director and voice actor. His most famous role was as Van Dalen in the commercials of Dutch supermarket chain Albert Heijn. He played this role from 2004 until 2015.

Career

2004 - 2015: Van Dalen and other roles
Piekema played the Supermarket manager Van Dalen between 2004 and 2015. This role was well received and earned him an oeuvre award during the Gouden Loeki awards, the biggest award for commercials in the Netherlands. His final commercial in januari 2015 also received the Gouden Loeki of 2015.

In 2013, Piekema provided his voice as the main narrator of De Nieuwe Wildernis.

2015 - Present: Later career
In 2016, Piekema would get roles in Fataal and the television series Caps Club. In 2017, Piekema debuted as Hoofdpiet in Sinterklaasjournaal. In 2019, Piekema reached the quarter finals in It Takes 2.

In 2020, Piekema temporarily took over the presentation of Lachen om Home Video's. Since 2021, Piekema has returned to playing in commercials, taking the role of Handige Harry in the commerciels of phone provider 50+ Mobiel. In 2022, Piekema participated in season 22 of the Dutch survival show Expeditie Robinson.

References

1959 births
Living people
Male actors from The Hague
Dutch male voice actors
Dutch male stage actors
Dutch clowns
Dutch theatre directors
21st-century Dutch male actors